Erhan Albayrak (born 5 April 1977) is a Turkish football manager and former player last managed FSV Duisburg.

Career
Grown up in the Hamburg quarter of Fischbek he played for the local club FC Süderelbe until he was 13 years old. Subsequently, he ran through the youth teams of Hamburger SV and Werder Bremen. His first appearance in the Bundesliga he also made for Werder in a 1–1 draw against Fortuna Düsseldorf on 11 August 1995, when he was just 18 years old.

Albayrak also played for Ankaragücü, Çaykur Rizespor, Fenerbahçe, Gaziantepspor, Kocaelispor, Ankaraspor in Turkey and Arminia Bielefeld in Germany. He has played as midfielder for Konyaspor in the Süper Lig. In December 2009, after seven years spent in Turkey, he returned to his native Germany and signed for KFC Uerdingen. He later played for FC Sylt.

Along with Ronny Kockel he was the manager of KFC Uerdingen 05 at the end of the 2011–12 season. In March 2014 he became the manager of the club once again. After just few weeks in the job he was sacked on 14 April 2014.

Honours
Kocaelispor
 Turkish Cup: 1997

References

External links
 
 
 
 

1977 births
Living people
Association football midfielders
Footballers from Hamburg
Turkish footballers
Turkey under-21 international footballers
Turkey youth international footballers
German footballers
German people of Turkish descent
MKE Ankaragücü footballers
Ankaraspor footballers
Fenerbahçe S.K. footballers
Gaziantepspor footballers
Kocaelispor footballers
Konyaspor footballers
Çaykur Rizespor footballers
Arminia Bielefeld players
SV Werder Bremen players
SV Werder Bremen II players
Süper Lig players
Bundesliga players
2. Bundesliga players
KFC Uerdingen 05 managers
German football managers